Liuquanju, founded in 1567, is one of the oldest restaurants in Beijing, China.
The name translated from Chinese means Willow Spring House and historic documents noted there was a big willow tree in the courtyard.

It was a well-known Beijing Yellow Wine tavern from its founding during the Ming dynasty.
The first owners were merchants from the Shandong Province.
In 1949 the restaurant moved to 217 Nandajie Street, Xinjiekou (新街口南大街217号), Beijing.

See also 
List of oldest companies

References 

Restaurants in Beijing
Companies established in the 16th century
16th-century establishments in China